Scolionema may refer to:
 Scolionema (hydrozoan), a genus of hydrozoans in the family Olindiidae
 Scolionema (fungus), a genus of fungi in the family Parodiopsidaceae